Westringia tenuicaulis, also known as  the Tufted Westringia, is a species of plant in the mint family that is endemic to Australia. Its natural range is restricted to the Fraser Coast Region of south-eastern Queensland, between Bundaberg and Sippy Downs.

References

tenuicaulis
Lamiales of Australia
Flora of Queensland
Taxa named by Cyril Tenison White
Taxa named by William Douglas Francis
Plants described in 1921